Wayne Robert Baker (born 4 December 1965) is an English former footballer who made five appearances in the Football League playing as a goalkeeper for Darlington. He was on the books of Sheffield Wednesday without representing them in the league, and played non-league football for clubs including Whitby Town, Frickley Athletic, Guiseley, Altrincham (two Alliance Premier League matches in each of the 1992–93 and 1993–94 seasons), Farsley Celtic (two spells), Harrogate Town, and Garforth Town.

References

1965 births
Living people
Footballers from Leeds
Association football goalkeepers
Sheffield Wednesday F.C. players
Whitby Town F.C. players
Darlington F.C. players
Frickley Athletic F.C. players
Guiseley A.F.C. players
Altrincham F.C. players
Farsley Celtic A.F.C. players
Harrogate Town A.F.C. players
Garforth Town A.F.C. players
English Football League players
National League (English football) players
Northern Premier League players
English footballers